Verkhneye-Chazhestrovo is a rural locality (a village) in Bereznikovskoye Rural Settlement of Vinogradovsky District, Arkhangelsk Oblast, Russia. The population was 205 as of 2010. There is 1 street.

Geography 
Verkhneye-Chazhestrovo is located on the Severnaya Dvina River, 4 km northwest of Bereznik (the district's administrative centre) by road. Bereznik is the nearest rural locality.

References 

Rural localities in Vinogradovsky District